Melpers is a village and a former municipality in the Schmalkalden-Meiningen district of Thuringia, Germany. Since 1 January 2019, it is part of the town Kaltennordheim.

References

Schmalkalden-Meiningen
Grand Duchy of Saxe-Weimar-Eisenach
Former municipalities in Thuringia